Haywood "Kissing Bug" Rose (1870 - January 7, 1947) was an Outfielder in the Negro leagues.

Rose died at the age of 77 in Chicago, Illinois.

References

External links

Columbia Giants players
Leland Giants players
Louisville White Sox players
Minneapolis Keystones players
St. Paul Colored Gophers players
1870 births
1947 deaths
People from Nashville, Tennessee
20th-century African-American people
Baseball outfielders